Laguna Colorada Airport  is an extremely high elevation airstrip just south of Laguna Colorada, a shallow salt lake within the Eduardo Avaroa Andean Fauna National Reserve in the southwest of the Bolivian altiplano,.

There is moderately high terrain north, northwest, and southeast of the runway. Another consideration is that the shallow lake has a large resident population of flamingoes.

See also

Transport in Bolivia
List of airports in Bolivia

References

External links 
OpenStreetMap - Laguna Colorada

Airports in Potosí Department